Masullo, Massullo is a surname of Italian origin. Notable people with the surname include:

 Carlo Massullo (born 1957), Italian modern pentathlete and Olympic champion
 Deb Massullo, Canadian female curler, World champion
 Francesco Paolo Masullo (1679–1733), Italian singer
 Marisa Masullo, former Italian athlete
 Ralph Massullo, American politician

Surnames of Italian origin